Glenfinnan railway station is a railway station serving the village of Glenfinnan in the Highland council area of Scotland. ScotRail, who manage the station, operate all services.

History 
Glenfinnan station opened on 1 April 1901. The station has two platforms, one on either side of a crossing loop. There are sidings on the south side of the station.

The station was host to a LNER camping coach from 1936 to 1939. A camping coach was also positioned here by the Scottish Region from 1952 to 1962, the coach was replaced in 1963 by a Pullman camping coach which was joined by another Pullman in 1967 until all camping coaches in the region were withdrawn at the end of the 1969 season.

Signalling 

From its opening in 1901 the Mallaig Extension Railway was worked throughout by the electric token system. Glenfinnan signal box, which had 15 levers, was at the east end of the Down platform, on the south side of the line.

On 13 November 1983, the method of working from Glenfinnan to  became One Train Working (with train staff). The Arisaig - Mallaig train staff would then be padlocked to the Glenfinnan - Arisaig key token.

Glenfinnan lost its semaphore signals on 13 April 1986, in preparation for Radio Electronic Token Block (RETB) signalling. RETB was commissioned between Mallaig Junction (now Fort William Junction) and Mallaig on 6 December 1987. This resulted in the closure of Glenfinnan signal box (amongst others). The RETB is controlled from a Signalling Centre at Banavie railway station.

The Train Protection & Warning System was installed in 2003.

Glenfinnan Station Museum 

The Glenfinnan Station Museum is located in the station building, on the Down platform. The museum's exhibits focus on the construction, impact and operation of the Mallaig Extension Railway in the late 19th century. The restored booking office includes the original tablet instruments and, again since early 2012, various artefacts specific to the local area. There is also a changing exhibition of railway photography and a gift shop. The museum is open seasonally.

During 2011 and early 2012, the entire Museum site underwent extensive refurbishment. This included major work to the Original Signal Box; a new external staircase, repairs to cladding and a reference theatre/teaching space installed. The main station building underwent alterations to meet current access requirements and new weather proofing on the roof. Ongoing work includes rebuilding the link path between the Station and Glenfinnan Viaduct, site of filming for several Harry Potter films, and expansion of the museum archives.

Facilities 
Platform 1 is equipped with a waiting room and a bench (the only facilities on platform 2), a help point and cycle racks. It is also adjacent to the car park, to which there is step-free access. The only access to platform 2 is via one of two barrow crossings. As there are no facilities to purchase tickets, passengers must buy one in advance, or from the guard on the train.

Passenger volume 

The statistics cover twelve month periods that start in April.

Services 

On Sundays there are three trains per day each way.

References

Bibliography

External links 

 Glenfinnan Station Museum - official site
 RAILSCOT on Mallaig Extension Railway

Lochaber
Category B listed buildings in Highland (council area)
Listed railway stations in Scotland
Railway stations in Highland (council area)
Former North British Railway stations
Railway stations in Great Britain opened in 1901
Railway stations served by ScotRail
Museums in Highland (council area)
Railway museums in Scotland
James Miller railway stations
1901 establishments in Scotland